Aragüita is a town and parish in Acevedo Municipality, Miranda, Venezuela.

Populated places in Miranda (state)
Parishes of Miranda (state)